Neochoerus aesopi was a relatively large rodent species native to North America until their extinction about 12,000 years ago, being closely related to modern capybaras (genus Hydrochoerus). It was part of the subfamily Hydrochoerinae. Fossils of it have been found in U.S. states such as Florida and South Carolina. The species was originally outlined in 1853, it weighed about 80 kg similar in size to the modern day capybara.

It has been synonymized with Hydrochoerus holmesi and several other formerly recognized extinct taxa. Identification of these types of rodent fossils is an inexact science, and lines between various classifications are often questionable. Unlike extant capybaras, N. aesopi lived in North America, where its ancestors had migrated from South America during the Great American Interchange.

See also
Hydrochoerinae
Hydrochoerus
Neochoerus
Neochoerus pinckneyi

References

Cavies